Ju Wu (born 3 September 1999) is a Chinese professional boxer who has held the IBO International lightweight title since 2019.

Professional boxing record

References

External links

Chinese male boxers
1999 births
Living people
Sportspeople from Jinan
Lightweight boxers